Dungeon Fighter Online (DFO), known in South Korea as Dungeon & Fighter (DNF), is a multiplayer beat 'em up action role-playing game, developed and published for personal computers by Neople, a South Korean subsidiary of Nexon, and originally published by Hangame in 2005. In 2014, Neople began an alpha test of a global version of Dungeon Fighter Online using the last English version hosted by Nexon, which has since ended.

This also makes it one of the highest-grossing entertainment media products of all time. The game has received Japanese anime and manga adaptations.

Gameplay
Dungeon Fighter Online is similar to classic 2D side-scrolling arcade hack and slash/beat 'em up games, such as Golden Axe or Double Dragon. Players traverse 2D screens while fighting hordes of monsters. There are a number of social aspects to Dungeon Fighter Online, including Guilds, PvP Arenas, Party Play.

Skills can be designated upon an upper row of hotkeys, that can be further expanded by the decision of the player. However, a player can choose to manually input the command to perform a certain skill; for example, a Blade Master can choose to press the assigned hotkey for the skill Draw Sword, but can also choose to perform its direct input. Directly inputting the skill (done by pressing the arrow keys in a certain sequence and then pressing the basic skill key) makes the skill cost less MP and lowers the cooldown of the skill (the time needed to wait to use the skill again) by a small amount. Skills are usually performed separately from normal combos; however, some skills are "cancellable," meaning that those skills can be used in the middle of normal attacks.

Development
Dungeon Fighter Online was developed by a South Korean company called Neople who previously only published a number of casual online games through their own game portal site. It was originally planned as a small game as the entire game was developed in five months based on the forecasted life expectancy. However, the response was better than they expected so the budget was increased and the game was expanded.

Extensive testing took place before the premiere launch in Korea. Three closed beta periods were held between December 17–31, 2004, February 1–13, 2005, and June 28 – July 11, 2005. Neople accepted only 999 players per test and allowed only one hundred minutes of gameplay per day. Content was fine-tuned and updated daily throughout the test period based on testers feedback. After a short hiatus, open beta commenced on August 10, 2005 at 3 pm. By 11 pm, there were over 15,000 concurrent users.

Even though many games being released at the time were 3D, Neople decided to create Dungeon Fighter Online in 2D because they did not believe it affected gameplay, they did not feel a 3D game could capture the look and feel of the original illustrations of the characters, the ease of casual players getting into the game, and they had more experience with 2D games. Hi-res is not a likely path the game will take because director Yun Jong Kim's main focus is "efficiency".

North American release
Five years after the original release in Korea, Nexon America revealed plans for an English version of Dungeon Fighter Online at the 2009 Game Developers Conference in late March. The title was renamed from Dungeon & Fighter to Dungeon Fighter Online because of the awkwardness to say "Dungeon and Fighter".

Thousands of applicants were accepted into closed beta, which held for seven days between July 28 – August 3, 2009. Closed beta for an English version of the game ran from July 28, 2009 to August 3, 2009. Early access has begun on September 15, 2009. Open beta started September 22, 2009. Open beta plans were announced at Penny Arcade Expo 2009. Early access to open beta, available for players who received a beta key, proceeded on September 15, 2009. Open beta began a week later on September 22, 2009. Dungeon Fighter Online officially launched on June 9, 2010. It was announced on April 2, 2013, that the North American version of Dungeon Fighter Online would be shutting down on June 13, 2013.

On May 15, 2014, Neople held an alpha test for a global version of the game. On October 10, 2014, beta testing was announced, set for March 24, 2015. Neople announced a closed beta test for Dungeon Fighter Online, scheduled for release around March 2015, due to them moving their office to the island of Jeju, located off the south-west coast of South Korea. However, it became an open beta test because the Facebook page for the game had reached a specific number of "Likes", something that had been previously promised by Neople when it was still planned for a closed beta test.

On January 19, 2016, Dungeon Fighter Online Season 2 was released. On August 9, 2016, the game was released on Steam as free-to-play, offering achievements and paid DLC. On January 17, 2017, Dungeon Fighter Online Season 3 was released. On February 27, 2018, Dungeon Fighter Online Season 4 was released. On February 26, 2019, Dungeon Fighter Online Season 5 was released.

Reception
Dungeon Fighter Online had a 300 million registered users celebration on May 25, 2011. On August 24, 2012, Nexon reported that the game recorded a peak activity of 3 million concurrent users in China alone. Dungeon Fighter Online had 25 million monthly active users as of November 2012. It reached a total of 600million users worldwide by 2018, and exceeded  registered users worldwide by March 2020.

The game grossed over $2 billion in revenue as of March 2012. As of 2015, it had an annual gross of $1.052 billion. Nexon revealed that Dungeon Fighter Online grossed a revenue of $8.7 billion in just over 10 years after its 2005 debut, more than the combined box office gross of Star Wars, the biggest film franchise at the time. In 2017, Dungeon Fighter Online grossed $1.6billion, making it the year's second highest-grossing PC game (after League of Legends) and third highest-grossing video game (after League of Legends and Honor of Kings). By the end of 2017, the game had exceeded  in worldwide revenue, becoming one of the most-played and highest-grossing video games of all time.

In March 2018, Dungeon Fighter Online was the highest-grossing PC game of the month, above League of Legends. Dungeon Fighters  March 2018 gross was the third highest ever monthly revenue for a free-to-play game. , Dungeon Fighter Online has exceeded $15 billion in lifetime gross revenue, making it one of the highest-grossing entertainment media IPs, with its lifetime revenue larger than the box office gross of the Star Wars, Harry Potter and Avengers film series.

Notes

References

External links

 Official website

Dungeon & Fighter (video game series)
2005 video games
Active massively multiplayer online games
Action role-playing video games
Beat 'em ups
Hack and slash games
Massively multiplayer online role-playing games
Nexon franchises
Role-playing video games
Side-scrolling beat 'em ups
Video games developed in South Korea
Windows-only games
Windows games